The 2008 NASCAR Corona Series was the fifth season of NASCAR-sanctioned stock car racing in Mexico.

Drivers

Schedule

Results and standings

Races

Standings

(key) Bold - Pole position awarded by time. Italics - Pole position set by final practice results or rainout. * – Most laps led.

The top 10

See also
2008 NASCAR Sprint Cup Series
2008 NASCAR Nationwide Series
2008 NASCAR Craftsman Truck Series
2008 NASCAR Camping World East Series
2008 NASCAR Camping World West Series
2008 NASCAR Canadian Tire Series

References

NASCAR Corona Series

NASCAR Mexico Series